The 2021 Courmayeur Ladies Open was a women's tennis tournament played on indoor hard courts. It was the first edition of the Courmayeur Ladies Open, and part of the WTA 250 series of the 2021 WTA Tour. It was held at the Courmayeur Sport Center in Courmayeur, Italy, from 25 until 31 October, 2021.

Champions

Singles

  Donna Vekić def.  Clara Tauson 7–6(7–3), 6–2

This was Vekić's third WTA singles title, and first since 2017.

Doubles

  Wang Xinyu /  Zheng Saisai def.  Eri Hozumi /  Zhang Shuai 6–4, 3–6, [10–5]

Singles main draw entrants

Seeds

 Rankings are as of October 18, 2021.

Other entrants
The following players received wildcards into the main draw:
  Martina Caregaro 
  Jessica Pieri 
  Lucrezia Stefanini

The following players received entry using a protected ranking into the main draw:
  Vitalia Diatchenko
  Kateryna Kozlova
  Mandy Minella

The following players received entry from the qualifying draw:
  Aliona Bolsova
  Cristina Bucșa
  Martina Di Giuseppe 
  Giulia Gatto-Monticone 
  Stephanie Wagner 
  Zheng Qinwen

The following players received entry as lucky losers:
  Urszula Radwańska
  Ankita Raina

Withdrawals
Before the tournament
  Belinda Bencic → replaced by  Kamilla Rakhimova
  Danielle Collins → replaced by  Anna Kalinskaya
  Camila Giorgi → replaced by  Urszula Radwańska
  Ons Jabeur → replaced by  Ankita Raina
  Tereza Martincová → replaced by  Mandy Minella
  Greet Minnen → replaced by  Hsieh Su-wei
  Nuria Párrizas Díaz → replaced by  Donna Vekić
  Elena Rybakina → replaced by  Kateryna Kozlova
  Maria Sakkari → replaced by  Stefanie Vögele
  Kateřina Siniaková → replaced by  Lucia Bronzetti
  Sara Sorribes Tormo → replaced by  Magdalena Fręch

Doubles main draw entrants

Seeds

 Rankings are as of October 18, 2021.

Other entrants
The following pairs received wildcards into the doubles main draw:
  Lucia Bronzetti /  Martina Caregaro 
  Giulia Gatto-Monticone /  Lisa Pigato

The following pair received entry as alternates:
  Natalia Vikhlyantseva /  Zheng Qinwen

Withdrawals 
Before the tournament
  Cristiana Ferrando /  Hsieh Su-wei → replaced by  Natalia Vikhlyantseva /  Zheng Qinwen
  Darija Jurak /  Andreja Klepač → replaced by  Vitalia Diatchenko /  Alexandra Panova
  Julia Lohoff /  Kamilla Rakhimova → replaced by  Aliona Bolsova /  Kamilla Rakhimova

References

External links
Official website
WTA Official website

Courmayeur Ladies Open
2021 in Italy
2021 in Italian tennis
Courmayeur Ladies Open
Sport in Courmayeur